Pseudophilautus  fulvus, known as Knuckles shrub frog is a species of frogs in the family Rhacophoridae.

It is endemic to Sri Lanka.

Its natural habitats are plantations, rural gardens, and heavily degraded former forest.
It is threatened by habitat loss.

References

fulvus
Endemic fauna of Sri Lanka
Frogs of Sri Lanka
Taxa named by Rohan Pethiyagoda
Amphibians described in 2004
Taxonomy articles created by Polbot